Bower is a Scottish and English surname. Notable people with the surname include: 

 Adrian Bower (born 1970), English actor
 Archibald Bower (1686–1766), Scottish historian
 B. M. Bower (1871–1940), American novelist
 Billy Bower (1887–1954), English footballer
 David Bower (born 1969), Welsh actor
 Edward Bower (1635–1667), English portrait painter
 Emma Eliza Bower (1852–1937) American physician, club-woman, and newspaper owner, publisher, editor
 Frederick Orpen Bower (1855–1948), English botanist
 Graham John Bower (1848–1933), Irish diplomat
 Gordon H. Bower (1932–2020), American cognitive psychologist
 Hetty Bower (1905–2013), English activist
 Iris Bower (1915–2005), a Royal Air Force nurse
 James Campbell Bower (born 1988), English actor, singer, and model
 Jeff Bower (American football) (born 1953), American football coach
 Jeff Bower (basketball) (born 1961), American basketball executive
 Johnny Bower (1924–2017), Canadian hockey goaltender
 John Nott-Bower (1892–1972), British policeman
 Lester Bower (1947–2015), American mass murderer
 Louisa Nott-Bower (née Yorke, 1861–1925), Welsh archer
 Mark Bower (born 1980), English footballer
 Marvin Bower (1903–2003), American lawyer
 Matthew Bower, British musician
 Michael Bower (born 1975), American actor
 Norman Adolph Henry Bower (1907–1990), British politician
 Paul Bower (born 1988), Australian rules footballer
 Robert Bower (disambiguation), multiple people
 Scott Bower (born 1978), American soccer player
 Shane Bower (wrestler) (1965–2007), Canadian professional Wrestler
 Steve Bower, English radio presenter
 Thomas Bower (1838–1919), English architect
 Tom Bower (born 1946), British writer
 Tom Bower (actor) (born 1938), American actor
 Walter Bower (c.1385–1449), Scottish chronicler

See also
Bauer (surname)
Bowers (surname)

English-language surnames
Scottish surnames